Rimfaxe is a glacier of the King Frederick VI Coast in the Sermersooq municipality, southeastern Greenland.

This glacier is named after Hrimfaxi, the cosmic horse of Norse mythology.

Geography 
Rimfaxe is a large, active glacier flowing from the eastern side of the Greenland ice sheet.

The Rimfaxe glacier flows roughly southeastward between high peaks and has its terminus in the Sehested Fjord shortly after its confluence with the Guldfaxe Glacier that joins it from the west. The smaller Ygdrasil glacier flows to the east, running parallel to it, and has its terminus in a lake that discharges right by the terminus of the Rimfaxe.

See also 
 List of glaciers in Greenland
 Skinfaxe (glacier)

References

External links 
 picture of the terminus
 Rimfaxe Glacier, Greenland
 Rimfaxe and Guldfaxe Glaciers – NASA, Operation IceBridge

Glaciers of Greenland
Sermersooq